Below are the rosters for the 2006 UEFA European Under-17 Championship held in Luxembourg.

Belgium
Coach: Eric Abrams

Czech Republic
Coach: Jakub Dovalil

Germany
Coach: Bernd Stöber

Hungary
Coach: József Both

Luxembourg
Coach: Ronny Bonvini

Russia
Coach: Igor Kolyvanov

Serbia and Montenegro
Coach: Saša Medin

Coach: Juan Santisteban

References

UEFA European Under-17 Championship squads
Squads